is a retired Japanese thoroughbred racehorse. In 2012 she won the Japanese Fillies Triple Crown and was voted Japanese Horse of the Year. She was also the first three-year-old filly to win the Japan Cup, in 2012, and the following year became the first two-time winner of that race. In 2014 she added victories in the Dubai Sheema Classic and the Arima Kinen earning her a second Horse of the Year award.

Background
Gentildonna is a bay filly bred in Japan by the Northern Racing Co Ltd. She was sired by the outstanding Japanese racehorse Deep Impact out of the British mare Donna Blini. 
Deep Impact was the Japanese Horse of the Year in 2005 and 2006, winning races including the Tokyo Yushun, Tenno Sho, Arima Kinen and Japan Cup. Donna Blini won the Group One Cheveley Park Stakes in 2005. Her full sister Donau Blue won Grade 3 Kyoto Himba Stakes and Sekiya Kinen.

Racing career

2011: two-year-old season
Gentildonna began her career by finishing second in a newcomers race but then won a maiden race to finish the season.

2012: three-year-old season
Gentildonna began her three-year-old season by winning the Grade 3 Shinzan Kinen against male horses over one mile at Kyoto in January and then finished fourth to Hana's Goal in the Tulip Sho at Hanshin Racecourse in March.

On 8 April, Gentildonna contested the first leg of the Fillies' Triple Crown, the Oka Sho over one mile at Hanshin. Starting at odds of 3.9/1, she won by half a length from Verxina. Gentildonna and Verxina met again in the Yushun Himba (the Japanese Oaks) on 20 May at Tokyo Racecourse. As Gentildonna's regular jockey Yasunari Iwata was on a 4-day suspension in NHK Mile Cup he was replaced by Yuga Kawada. Verxina was preferred in the betting, But Gentildonna won by five lengths to claim the second leg of the Triple Crown.

After a break of almost four months, Gentildonna returned to contest the Rose Stakes at Hanshin and won by one and a half lengths from Verxina. At Kyoto on 14 October, Gentildonna completed the Triple Crown and defeated Verxina for the fourth time in a row when prevailing by a nose in the Shuka Sho. She is the fourth Japanese Triple Crown winner after Apapane in 2010. On 24 November, Gentildonna faced an international field in the Japan Cup a race which had never been won by a three-year-old filly. Her rivals included the 2011 Japanese Horse of the Year Orfevre and the Prix de l'Arc de Triomphe winner Solemia. Ridden by Yasunari Iwata and despite coming from a very wide barrier draw of 15, Gentildonna won by a nose form Orfevre. There was a protest made for interference by the connections of Orfevre, and Gentildonna had to wait 20 long minutes until her triumph was confirmed, at the cost of subsequent 2-day suspension to Iwata.

2013: four-year-old season
On 30 March Gentildonna raced outside Japan for the first time when she started the 11/8 favourite for the Dubai Sheema Classic but was beaten two and a quarter lengths by the Irish six-year-old St Nicholas Abbey. After the race, Yasunari Iwata admitted that St Nicholas Abbey had been the better horse on the night, but pointed out that the filly had been forced to race wide for much of the race. Gentildonna was off the course for almost three months before returning in the Takarazuka Kinen at Hanshin Racecourse. She started the 7/5 favourite, but finished third of the eleven runners behind Gold Ship and the five-year-old Danon Ballade.

Gentildonna began her autumn campaign in the Tennō Shō at Tokyo on 27 October. She started the even money favourite, but finished second, beaten four lengths by the four-year-old colt Just A Way. After three consecutive defeats, Yasunari Iwata lost the ride on Gentildonna, and when the filly appeared to defend the Japan Cup on 24 November, she was ridden by the British jockey Ryan Moore who had received a temporary contract from the JRA. In front of a crowd of 89,719, Gentildonna started the 11/10 favourite ahead of Gold Ship on 2.4/1 and Eishin Flash on 3.9/1. The race was run at a slow pace, and Moore positioned Gentildonna just behind the leaders before accelerating through a gap on the inside to take the lead in the straight. In the closing stages the three-year-old filly Denim And Ruby produced a strong run on the wide outside, but Gentildonna held on to win by a nose, becoming the first horse to win the race twice. Commenting on her earlier run of defeats Ishizaka said "I had been training her to win every time, but I was very relieved that she was able to claim the Cup again in her last start of the season. Thinking about our staff; they've put in so much effort. The fans still believed in her. I was much relieved that she was able to prove she's still a very special horse".

2014: five-year-old season
Gentildonna began her 2014 season in the Group Two Kyoto Kinen on 16 February. She started the odds-on favourite but finished sixth of the twelve runners behind the 33/1 outsider Desperado. As in the previous season, Gentildonna was sent to Dubai to contest the Dubai Sheema Classic on 29 March. Ridden by Ryan Moore, she started the 4/1 second favourite behind the Breeders' Cup Turf winner Magician. The mare was restrained in the early stages before making progress with three furlongs to run but was blocked when challenging for the lead in the straight forcing Moore to switch sharply to the right in the closing stages. Gentildonna took the lead from Cirrus des Aigles a furlong from the finish and won "comfortably" by one and a half lengths. Moore said "I was just hemmed in a bit in the straight. But when I pulled her out she has quickened up very well. She has got an awful lot of heart". On her return to Japan, the mare again contested the Takarazuka Kinen at Hanshin Racecourse but finished seventh of the twelve runners, seven and a half lengths behind the winner Gold Ship.

After a four-month summer break, Gentildonna returned to contest Japan's three most important autumn races, beginning with the Tenno Sho on 2 November. Ridden for the first time by Keita Tosaki she finished second of the eighteen runners, beaten three quarters of a length Spielberg with the favourite Isla Bonita taking third ahead of the unusually named Love Is Boo Shet. On 3 November she started favourite against seventeen opponents as she attempted to win the Japan Cup for and unprecedented third time. Ridden again by Moore she finished fourth behind Epiphaneia, Just A Way and Spielberg. The Arima Kinen over 2500 metres at Nakayama Racecourse on 28 December attracted its customary strong field, and Gentildonna started fourth in the betting behind Gold Ship, Epiphaneia and Just A Way with the other contenders including Denim And Ruby, One And Only (Tokyo Yushun), Meisho Mambo, Fenomeno and Verxina. Verxina was the early leader before Epiphaneia took the lead 400 metres from the finish but Gentildonna made steady progress in the straight and made her bid for victory in the last 200 metres. She gained the advantage and held off several late challenges to win by three quarters of a length from the three-year-old colt To The World, with Gold Ship, Just A Way, Epiphaneia, Lachesis and Last Impact close behind.

Gentildonna's retirement ceremony was held at Nakayama Racecourse right after she had won the Arima Kinen.

Stud Career 
Gentildonna has foaled Geraldina (sire: Maurice), who won the Sankei Sho All Comers and Queen Elizabeth II Cup in 2022. Gentildonna has also foaled Moana Anela (sire: King Kamehameha) and Marina Donna (sire: Lord Kanaloa).

Awards and assessment
In the polling for the 2012 JRA Award Gentildonna was elected Japanese Horse of the Year, taking 256 of the 289 votes beating Gold Ship (21 votes), Orfevre (11 votes) and the sprinter Lord Kanaloa (1 vote). She also took all the votes cast in the poll for the JRA Award for Best Three-Year-Old Filly.

In January 2014, Gentildonna won the JRA Award for Best Older Filly or Mare, taking 274 of the 280 votes.

Gentildonna won the Japanese Horse of the Year award again in January 2015 by 231 votes to 51 from Just A Way. She added a second Best Older Filly or Mare title, being the unanimous choice of the 285 electors.

On 12 September 2016, Gentildonna was inducted in the Japan Racing Association Hall of Fame.

Pedigree

See also
 List of historical horses

References

Racehorses bred in Japan
Racehorses trained in Japan
2009 racehorse births
Thoroughbred family 16-f
Japan Cup winners
Triple Crown of Thoroughbred Racing winners